Taipei Representative Office in Finland is the de facto embassy of the Republic of China (Taiwan) in Finland. In Finnish it's officially called yhteystoimisto (lit. 'contact office') as the two countries does not have formal diplomatic ties. 

The aim of the representative office is to further bilateral cooperation between Finland and Taiwan in the fields of economics, culture, education and research. In addition it offers consular services.

The representative office was opened in 1990. A year later a similar office from Finland's side opened in Taipei. The representative office of Helsinki is located at Aleksanterinkatu 17 in the World Trade Center building.

References 

Taiwan
Finland
Finland–Taiwan relations
Buildings and structures in Helsinki